Walter Wayne Christian (born September 26, 1950) is an American politician and financial planner from Center, Texas, who serves as a Republican member of the Texas Railroad Commission, having first won the position in the general election of November 8, 2016.

In June 2019, Christian was elected commission chairman by his two colleagues, fellow Republicans Christi Craddick and Ryan Sitton.

He formerly served in the  Texas House of Representatives for District 9, which included Jasper, Nacogdoches, Sabine, San Augustine, and Shelby counties in East Texas.

Background

Walter Wayne Christian is the son of James Eric Christian (1925–1984) and the former Tommie Nura. His family roots in Shelby County date back four generations. He was born in Center but reared in nearby Tenaha, where he attended public schools and graduated as valedictorian of his 1969 class at Tenaha High School. According to his website, in 1975 he married the former Lisa Ruth Lemoine of nearby Shelbyville. The couple has three daughters: Liza, Lindsey, and Lauren.

In the 1970s, Wayne was the leader of a successful Southern gospel band, The Singing Christians. In 1979, Wayne and his bandmates created the Mercy River Boys. They were twice nominated for a Grammy Award by the National Academy Of Recording Arts and Sciences. Wayne Christian was inducted into the Texas Gospel Music Hall Of Fame in November 2015.

Christian is an agent of Woodbury Financial Services. He holds a Bachelor of Business Administration degree from Stephen F. Austin State University in Nacogdoches, where he minored in marketing.

Political life
Christian is a conservative Christian and opposed to abortion. He is the former president of the Texas Conservative Coalition, a bipartisan caucus of conservative legislators. He was also a board member of the Texas TEA Party Caucus. During his tenure in the legislature, Christian was heavily involved in energy and oil and gas issues, serving on the Energy Resources Committee and as Vice Chairman of the Regulated Industries Committee. He also served as Vice Chairman of the Criminal Jurisprudence committee and on the Ways and Means Committee.

Throughout his years as a member of the Texas House, Christian received numerous awards for his conservative voting record. In 1997, he was named "Outstanding Freshman Legislator of the Year" by the Texas Republican Caucus. Texans for Fiscal Responsibility designated him a "Taxpayer Hero" and "Taxpayer Champion". He was formerly named "National Legislator of the Year" by the conservative interest group, the American Legislative Exchange Council. The Texas Association of Business named him "Fighter for Free Enterprise." Young Conservatives of Texas presented Christian with their "Torch of Freedom Lifetime Achievement Award." Vision America named Christian, who is of the Baptist denomination, a "Hero of the Faith." The Texas County Extension Service named him "Man of the Year in Texas Agriculture." The Texas branch of Phyllis Schlafly's Eagle Forum presented him with its "Freedom and Family Award" and also recognized Christian as one of the sixteen "most conservative" members of the legislature, out of a total of 181 members who serve in both legislative chambers. In the 80th legislative session, Mike Hailey's Capitol Insider declared Christian's voting record to be "100 percent conservative."

During the 82nd Legislature, Christian was awarded "Legislator of the Year" by Texas Conservative Digest, and scored a 100 percent conservative rating on the Texas Eagle Forum scorecard, as well as an A+ rating from Texans for Fiscal Responsibility, an interest group founded by Michael Quinn Sullivan. During the session, Christian worked on lingering issues such as the future of power plants in East Texas, issues surrounding the exploration and production of natural gas in the Haynesville Shale, and settling the 30-year water level problems of Toledo Bend Reservoir on the Sabine River, located on the Texas/Louisiana border.

Christian won his initial term in the State House in 1996 with less than 51 percent of the general election vote, making him the first Republican elected in deep East Texas since reconstruction. In 2004, he made an unsuccessful bid for the Republican nomination for the United States House of Representatives for the seat now held by fellow Republican Louie Gohmert of Tyler. In 2007, Christian returned to the Texas House after a two-year absence. He unseated freshman Representative Roy Morris Blake Jr., of Nacogdoches in the March 2006 Republican primary, and Christian was unopposed in the following general election.

In 2009, a controversial amendment sponsored by fellow Republican, Mike "Tuffy" Hamilton, passed the Texas House, allowing Christian and a handful of neighbors on the Bolivar Peninsula near Galveston to rebuild houses destroyed by Hurricane Ike. The measure easily passed the legislature with almost no objection. Governor Rick Perry let the bill, and subsequently the Hamilton amendment, become law without his signature. The measure was strongly opposed by then Commissioner of the General Land Office Jerry E. Patterson, who vowed not to enforce the measure. Christian denied that the amendment was at odds with the Texas Open Beaches Act or an environmental interference but argued that it reflected the right of property owners to use their property as they deem appropriate. The Texas Supreme Court has since sided with the private landowners in the area and upheld the private property protections put in place by Hamilton's amendment.

Under the 2012 redistricting plan for the Texas House, Christian's home in Center was placed in a district in which approximately 80 percent of the constituents were new to him. He was one of several senior House Republicans who were either paired with other members of their party or relocated into largely new population districts. These members blamed Speaker Joe Straus, a moderate Republican from San Antonio, for redrawing their district lines to their disadvantage. In both 2009 and 2011, Christian and much of the East Texas delegation unsuccessfully opposed the election of Straus as Speaker.

Christian was unseated in the Republican primary held on May 29, 2012 by the Straus-endorsed Chris Paddie, 8,552 votes (47.8 percent) to 9,327 ballots (52.2 percent).

Candidacy for Texas Railroad Commission

2014
Christian ran unsuccessfully for one of the three elected seats on the Texas Railroad Commission in the Republican runoff election held on May 27, 2014. He lost to intraparty challenger and current colleague Ryan Sitton, an oil and natural gas engineer from Friendswood, who polled 398,652 (57.3 percent). Christian trailed with 297,654 (42.7 percent).

Christian led the four-candidate primary field with 501,820 votes (42.7 percent). Sitton trailed Christian in the first round of balloting, having polled 358,827 (30.5 percent). Two other candidates, geologist Becky Berger of Schulenburg and businessman Malachi Boyuls of Dallas, polled 197,805 votes (16.8 percent) and 117,121 (10 percent), respectively.

2016
In 2016, Christian became the Republican nominee for the commissioner spot held by David J. Porter, who did not seek re-election to a second term. In the Republican primary on March 1, Christian finished second among seven candidates with 408,629 votes (19.8 percent). Businessman Gary Gates of Richmond, Texas, led the balloting with 586,253 votes (28.4 percent).

In December 2015, Christian temporarily suspended his campaign to care for his elderly mother but was soon back soliciting supporters. He was endorsed by the political action committee, Texas Patriots Tea Party.

Christian barely defeated Gates in the runoff contest, 192,599 votes (50.9 percent) to 185,887 (49.1 percent). Only 2.65 percent of registered voters participated in the Republican runoff. In his own Shelby County, Christian prevailed, 1,595 to 369, one of his strongest margins across the state. He led by nearly five thousand votes in Lubbock County, where turnout was heavier because of a race for the United States House of Representatives for Texas's 19th congressional district. Christian subsequently defeated the Democrat Grady Talbert Yarbrough, an African-American retired educator who resides in East Texas, Libertarian Mark Miller, who carried the editorial backing of the Dallas Morning News, and Green candidate Martina Salinas. Christian polled 4,648,841 votes (53.1 percent); Yarbrough, 3,362,041 (38.4 percent); Miller, 462,251 (5.3 percent), and Salinas, 287,105 (3.2 percent).

References

|-

|-

1950 births
21st-century American politicians
Baptists from Texas
Businesspeople from Texas
Canaan Records artists
Christian country singers
Living people
Members of the Railroad Commission of Texas
Republican Party members of the Texas House of Representatives
People from Center, Texas
People from Tenaha, Texas
Southern gospel performers
Stephen F. Austin State University alumni